The Tripoli Community School District is a rural public school district serving the town of Tripoli and surrounding areas in Bremer County, including the town of Frederika, and a small section in southern Chickasaw County.

Jay Marley serves as the superintendent for the Tripoli school district. The school's mascot is the Panthers. Their colors are orange and black.

Schools
The district operates two schools, both located in Tripoli:

Tripoli Elementary School
Tripoli Middle/Sr High School

Tripoli High School

Athletics 
The Panthers compete in the Iowa Star Conference, including the following sports:

Cross County (boys and girls)
Volleyball
 11-time Class 1A State Champions (1999, 2000, 2001, 2003, 2004, 2005, 2008, 2009, 2010, 2011, 2012)
Football
Basketball (boys and girls)
Wrestling 
 2-time Class 2A State Champions - 2010, 2012 (as Denver-Tripoli)
 2010 Class 2A State Duals Champions (as Denver-Tripoli) 
Track and Field (boys and girls)
Golf (boys and girls)
 Boys' 1986 Class 2A State Champions
Baseball 
Softball

See also
List of school districts in Iowa
List of high schools in Iowa

References

External links
 Tripoli Community School District

Education in Bremer County, Iowa
Education in Chickasaw County, Iowa
School districts in Iowa